Count Grigory Kirillovich  Razumovsky (November 10, 1759 – June 3, 1837) was a Russian nobleman, political philosopher, botanist, zoologist and geologist.

Career
Razumovsky is known from his writings in the West as Gregor or Grégoire, who lost his Russian citizenship for openly criticizing the czarist system under emperor Alexander I, which he saw as pandering to the desires of a corrupt oligarchy of nobles. Gregor emigrated to western Europe, where was subsequently incorporated into the Bohemian nobility (Inkolat im Herrenstande) in 1811 and accorded the rank of count of the Austrian Empire. As a natural scientist, Gregor was the first to describe and classify Lissotrion helveticus. He was the fifth son of the last hetman of Ukraine, Kirill Grigorievich Razumovsky and brother of prince Andreas Razumovsky, he is also the ancestor of all living members of the family as such, the Russian lines having gone extinct.

In the field of geology, Razumovsky has been described as a "non-actualistic catastrophist". He was also an advocate of Neptunism.

In 1788, he was elected a foreign member of the Royal Swedish Academy of Sciences.

Publications 

 Observations Minéralogiques sur les environs de Vienne (1822).
 «Essai d’un système de transition de la nature dans le règne minéral. Lausanne»
 «Oeuvres de M. le comte Grégoire de Razoumowsky». Lausanne, chez Maures Cadet. 1784. 2 vol.
 "Histoire naturelle de Jorat et de ses environs et celle des trois lacs de Neufchatel, Morat et Brienne, précédée d’un essai sur le climat, les productions, le commerce, les animaux de la partie du pays de Vaud ou de la Suisse Romanne, qui entre dans le plan de cet ouvrage, par le comte de Razoumowsky (Lausanne, chez Jean Maures. 1789. 2 vol).
 Von der Ukrainischen Stutereien. Lernbegriff von den Krankheiten der Pferde und deren Heilung von I. C. Zeihers. Berlin. 8

Memberships 

 Royal Swedish Academy of Sciences
 Royal Academy of Turin
 Bavarian Academy of Sciences and Humanities
 Russian Mineralogical Society
 Jena Mineralogical Society
 Imperial Moscow Society of Naturalists
 Zurich Physical Society
 Basel Medical Physics Society
 Turin Agronomic Society

References

1759 births
1837 deaths
Catastrophism
Members of the Royal Swedish Academy of Sciences
Scientists from Saint Petersburg
Grigory
Russian geologists
Russian people of Ukrainian descent